Most Welcome is a 2012 Bangladeshi action film directed by Anonno Mamun and produced by Ananta Jalil under his production banner Monsoon Films. The film features Ananta Jalil and Afiea Nusrat Barsha in lead roles. This movie is a remake of Vikram's Tamil movie Kanthaswamy (2009).

Cast
 Ananta Jalil Ariyan
 Barsha Adhora
 Nayok Raj Razzak
 Bapparaj police officer
 Ahmed Sharif
 Rex Jafor as Ahmed 
 Sohel Rana
 Misha Sawdagor Asif khan
 Sneha Ullal as special appearance in title song

Release
It had an Eid release in August, 2012 in Bangladesh. Most Welcome was also screened in the United Kingdom, where it opened in eight theatres. The international premiere was held on 10 March 2013 in Cineworld, Ilford.

Critical reception
Rifat Islam Esha, reviewing it for New Age, wrote, "Go watch the movie! It's worth it. Laugh if you like but it's the first time in Bangladesh that someone has incorporated such 'Pojukti' [technique] in films and I believe this will take our movie industry to the 'other' level very soon indeed."

Box office
Film website Twitch Film describes Most Welcome as the "biggest box office hit" of summer 2012.

Soundtrack

Sequel
Most Welcome 2

References

External links

 

2012 films
2012 action films
Bengali-language Bangladeshi films
Bangladeshi action films
Bangladeshi remakes of Indian films
Films scored by S I Tutul
Films scored by Hridoy Khan
Films scored by Arfin Rumey
Films scored by Akassh
2010s Bengali-language films
Films directed by Anonno Mamun
Monsoon Films films